Vipul Amrutlal Shah (commonly known as Vipul Shah) is a film producer and director of Hindi films. He began his career with Gujarati theater. He was part/director of a number of Gujarati dramas, some of which were well received by Gujarati audience. He made his debut with Gujarati film 'Dariya-Chhoru' (means children of ocean) in late 90s, with JD Majethia in main lead. As of 2010, he has directed six Hindi films, four of which have starred Akshay Kumar.

Career
Vipul Amrutlal Shah started his career on small screen with the soap opera Ek Mahal Ho Sapno Ka, which aired on Sony Entertainment Television. The serial went on to become the longest running family drama with over 1000 episodes.

Shah's directorial debut was Dariya Chhoru (Gujarati). He then made his debut in Hindi films with Aankhen, which was based on his Gujarati play 'Aandhlo Pato' ("Blind Fold"). It was one of the five biggest hits of 2002. He then impressed the audience and critics in his next film Waqt: The Race Against Time, which was again based on a Gujarati play 'Aavjo Vhala Phari Malishu' ("Good bye dear, will meet again"). It was also one of the highest-grossing films of 2005. His next two films, Namastey London and Singh Is Kinng did very well at the box office with the latter breaking all previous opening records in Bollywood. In 2009, he directed London Dreams, starring Salman Khan, Ajay Devgan and Asin Thottumkal, which was an average grosser at the box office. His 2010 release, Action Replay starring Akshay Kumar and Aishwarya Rai, was not well received.

In March 2011, Shah announced his intention to make a sequel of his 2007 film Namastey London.

Personal life

He is married to actress Shefali Shah and has two sons. And he studied in KC College, Mumbai.

Filmography

As director

As producer

Television series

References

External links

 

Hindi film producers
Living people
Hindi-language film directors
Film producers from Gujarat
Film directors from Gujarat
Indian television producers
Indian television directors
21st-century Indian film directors
People from Kutch district
Year of birth missing (living people)

|}